Ezequiel Brítez (born June 25, 1985) is an Argentine footballer recently  plays for SHB Đà Năng of the V.League 1 in Vietnam.

Honours

Club
Irapuato
Liga de Ascenso:
Winners (1):   Clausura 2011

Estudiantes de La Plata
Primera División de Argentina:
Winners (1):   Torneo Apertura 2006

Talleres
Torneo Argentino A:
Winners (1):   2012–13 Torneo Argentino A

External links
 Profile at BDFA 

1985 births
Living people
Argentine footballers
Argentine expatriate footballers
Estudiantes de La Plata footballers
Irapuato F.C. footballers
Nueva Chicago footballers
Rangers de Talca footballers
Millonarios F.C. players
SHB Da Nang FC players
Chilean Primera División players
Argentine Primera División players
Categoría Primera A players
V.League 1 players
Expatriate footballers in Chile
Expatriate footballers in Mexico
Expatriate footballers in Colombia
Expatriate footballers in Vietnam
Argentine expatriate sportspeople in Chile
Argentine expatriate sportspeople in Mexico
Argentine expatriate sportspeople in Colombia
Argentine expatriate sportspeople in Vietnam
Association football central defenders
Footballers from Rosario, Santa Fe